Jacob van den Belt (born 30 September 1981 in Rotterdam) was formerly a Dutch professional player of association football. His position was goalkeeper. His height 1.90 meters.

Van den Belt played in youth teams of Feyenoord and SBV Excelsior. He turned professional at RBC Roosendaal. In the season 2001–2002 he played 3 Eredivisie games for this team. In Summer 2002 he transferred to VVV-Venlo where he also had three caps.

Van den Belt then played in major amateur leagues for DOTO (2003–2008), ASWH (2008–2010), SC Feyenoord (2010–2011), RVVH (2011–2014
), and VV Oude Maas (2014–2017). In 2017 he retired from playing in football leagues.

References

1981 births
Living people
ASWH players
Feyenoord players
Association football goalkeepers
RVVH players
RBC Roosendaal players
VVV-Venlo players
Excelsior Rotterdam players
Footballers from Rotterdam
SC Feyenoord players
Dutch footballers